Poor Man's Pudding is a Canadian satirical comedy film, released in 1996. It was the final theatrical film directed by Gilles Carle.

Plot

The film stars Chloé Sainte-Marie as Yo-Yo and Louis-Philippe Davignon-Daigneault as Alphonse, a New Age cult priestess in Montreal and her faith healer nephew. Events are set in motion when Alphonse's father Aristide (François Léveillé) threatens to commit suicide by jumping off the Jacques Cartier Bridge, leading to an ad hoc neighbourhood referendum on whether or not he should jump.

Production
The film is in part a satire of the political and social rhetoric, on both sides of the issue, in the 1995 Quebec referendum; Carle was inspired by, and singled out for special opprobrium in his film, the notion offered by some of his sovereignist friends that Quebec independence would in and of itself solve the social problems of poverty, unemployment and homelessness.

Awards
The film garnered two Genie Award nominations at the 17th Genie Awards in 1996, in the categories of Best Screenplay (Carle) and Best Costume Design (Denis Sperdouklis).

References

External links
 

1996 films
1996 comedy films
Films directed by Gilles Carle
Canadian political satire films
Films set in Montreal
French-language Canadian films
1990s Canadian films
Films about faith healing
Films about suicide